The Parpaner Schwarzhorn is a mountain of the Plessur Alps, overlooking Parpan in the canton of Graubünden. It lies north of the Parpaner Weisshorn.

References

External links
Parpaner Schwarzhorn on Hikr

Mountains of the Alps
Mountains of Switzerland
Mountains of Graubünden